Motaharabad may refer to:
 Motaharabad, Rudbar-e Jonubi
 Motaharabad, Zarand